Lino Benoni (born 4 January 1950) is an Italian bobsledder. He competed in the four man event at the 1976 Winter Olympics.

References

External links
 

1950 births
Living people
Italian male bobsledders
Olympic bobsledders of Italy
Bobsledders at the 1976 Winter Olympics
Sportspeople from Trentino